Andreas "Lumpi" Lambertz (born 15 October 1984) is a retired German footballer and current assistant manager of Fortuna Düsseldorf II. 

He is the first German football player to have promoted from the fourth tier to first tier with only one club.

Career

Youth career
Lambertz began his youth football career in 1990 with SG Orken/Noithausen. He also played for Bayer Dormagen, TSV Norf, Borussia Mönchengladbach and VfR Neuss prior to joining Fortuna Düsseldorf.

Fortuna Düsseldorf
Lambertz began his professional career at Fortuna Düsseldorf which was playing in the Oberliga Nordrhein at the time.

Lambertz was in the starting lineup that sent Fortuna Düsseldorf to the Bundesliga for the first time in 15 years.

Lambertz started the 2012–13 season with a two match ban. The ban is for celebrating with a torch in his hand after the 2nd leg of the promotion/relegation playoff when Fortuna Düsseldorf defeated Hertha BSC on aggregate.

Personal life
Lambertz has one sister. He is married with a son born in 2006 and daughter born in 2011 and lives in Korschenbroich.

Career statistics

Club

1.Includes promotion/relegation playoff.

References

External links
  
 

1984 births
Living people
Association football midfielders
German footballers
Fortuna Düsseldorf players
Dynamo Dresden players
Bundesliga players
2. Bundesliga players
3. Liga players